The 1964 UK & Ireland Greyhound Racing Year was the 38th year of greyhound racing in the United Kingdom and Ireland.

Roll of honour

Summary
The Dagenham Coup incident that took place at Dagenham Greyhound Stadium on 30 June 1964 took all the headlines and became one of the most infamous moments in greyhound racing history.

Despite the government reducing the totalisator tax to 5% from 10%, the industry saw a further fall in attendances. The National Greyhound Racing Club (NGRC) affiliated tracks saw 11,208,657 paying customers at 6011 meetings with tote turnover of £50,178,166.

Tracks
The Greyhound Racing Association (GRA) acquired Catford Stadium. Crayford & Bexleyheath Stadium owners Northumbrian and Crayford Trust Ltd joined the Totalisator Holdings group, owners of six other tracks. The Liverpool tracks of Seaforth Greyhound Stadium and White City Stadium (Liverpool) re-joined the NGRC set up after spells as independent tracks. 

A new independent opened called the Boston Sports Stadium in New Hammond Beck Road but the worrying trend of tracks closing continued. Lythalls Lane Stadium in Coventry closed and was sold for redevelopment as a housing estate, with the prestigious Eclipse Stakes switching to Kings Heath Stadium in Birmingham. The owners of the Coventry track also owned the Brandon Speedway Stadium and had plans to bring greyhounds there. The other tracks to close were Blackpool Greyhound Stadium, Darnall Stadium and the independent Northampton track.

Competitions
Cranog Bet won a second consecutive Oaks at Harringay Stadium which led to her being voted bitch of the year for the second year running. She won 18 of her 24 open races in 1964. 

The greyhound of the year award went to a black dog called Lucky Hi There, whelped in November 1961. He switched to the longer trip after appearing the year before in the Laurels final and the Gold Collar final in May, where it was soon apparent that his future lay in stayer's races. He duly performed superbly and won the Cambridgeshire, Orient Cup, Wimbledon Spring Cup, Wembley Gold Cup and Scottish St Leger. In his first classic of the year at Wembley he won the St Leger title and was well on the way to eventually going sixteen races before finally being beaten, just three short of Mick the Miller's record. During 1964 he won 27 of his 35 races.

News
Trainer George Waterman died which came as a shock to the industry. He had started the early part of the year impressively, by winning the Gold Collar, the Pall Mall Stakes, Cloth of Gold, Coronation Cup and Springbok. Wimbledon Stadium would appoint Nora Gleeson to fill the gap left at the Burhill kennel range. White City recruited trainer Randolph Singleton from sister track Belle Vue Stadium.  

We'll See (the 1963 greyhound of the year) died on his way back to the GRA kennels at Northaw while in transit after heart failure; he had just won a heat of the Birmingham Cup.

Principal UK races

+Equalled Track record

Principal Irish races

u=unplaced

Totalisator returns

The totalisator returns declared to the licensing authorities for the year 1964 are listed below.

References 

Greyhound racing in the United Kingdom
Greyhound racing in the Republic of Ireland
UK and Ireland Greyhound Racing Year
UK and Ireland Greyhound Racing Year
UK and Ireland Greyhound Racing Year
UK and Ireland Greyhound Racing Year